Mount Sifton is a  mountain summit located in Glacier National Park, in the Hermit Range of the Selkirk Mountains in British Columbia, Canada. The  nearest higher peak is Mount Rogers,  to the north-northeast. The first ascent of the mountain was made September 3, 1900, by Arthur Michael, Edward Feuz, and Friedrich Michel via the southeast ridge. The peak's name honors Sir Clifford Sifton (1861–1929), Canadian Minister of the Interior from 1896 through 1905. The mountain's toponym was adopted in 1906, then re-approved September 8, 1932, by the Geographical Names Board of Canada.

Climate
Based on the Köppen climate classification, Mount Sifton is located in a subarctic climate zone with cold, snowy winters, and mild summers. Winter temperatures can drop below −20 °C with wind chill factors below −30 °C. Precipitation runoff from the mountain and meltwater from surrounding glaciers on its slopes drains into tributaries of the Beaver River and Illecillewaet River.

Climbing Routes
Established climbing routes on Mount Sifton:

 Southeast Ridge -  First ascent 1900
 South Face -  FA 1932
 North Face - FA 1970
 West Ridge - class 5.0
 Northwest Ridge - class 3 FA 1984

See also

 Geography of British Columbia
 Geology of British Columbia

References

External links
 Weather: Mount Sifton

Two-thousanders of British Columbia
Selkirk Mountains
Glacier National Park (Canada)
Columbia Country
Kootenay Land District